We Feed the World is a 2005 documentary in which Austrian filmmaker Erwin Wagenhofer traces the origins of the food we eat and views modern industrial production of food and factory farming in a critical light. His journey takes him to France, Spain, Romania, Switzerland, Brazil and back to Austria.

The film features interviews with several people, including one with sociologist and politician Jean Ziegler.

The film was the most successful Austrian documentary ever. In German-speaking countries it was seen by about 600,000 cinemagoers.

See also

The Jungle
A Place at the Table

References

External links
Official website in German

2005 films
Documentary films about agriculture
Documentary films about environmental issues
Films set in Austria
Films set in Romania
Films set in Switzerland
Films set in France
Films set in Spain
Films set in Brazil
2005 documentary films
Austrian documentary films